Thomas Middlecott Academy is a coeducational secondary school in Kirton, Lincolnshire, England.

It was previously a community school administered by Lincolnshire County Council, but converted to academy status in March 2015. However the school was renamed from Middlecott School to Thomas Middlecott Academy in January 2015. The school has joined other academies as part of the David Ross Education Trust, however the school continues to coordinate with Lincolnshire County Council for its admissions.

The school's curriculum includes GCSEs and BTECs, with some courses taken in conjunction with Boston College.

References

External links
Thomas Middlecott Academy official website

Secondary schools in Lincolnshire
Academies in Lincolnshire
Kirton, Lincolnshire